The 1978 Benson & Hedges Championships, also known as the Wembley Championships, was a men's tennis tournament played on indoor carpet courts at the Wembley Arena in London in England that was part of the 1978 Colgate-Palmolive Grand Prix. The tournament was held from 14 November until 18 November 1978. Third-seeded John McEnroe won the singles title.

Finals

Singles
 John McEnroe defeated  Tim Gullikson 6–7, 6–4, 7–6, 6–2
 It was McEnroe's 4th singles title of the year and of his career.

Doubles
 Peter Fleming /  John McEnroe defeated  Bob Hewitt /   Frew McMillan 7–6, 4–6, 6–4

References

External links
 ITF tournament edition details

Benson and Hedges Championships
Wembley Championships
Benson and Hedges Championships
Benson and Hedges Championships
Benson and Hedges Championships
Tennis in London